Finis Jennings Dake (October 18, 1902 – July 7, 1987) was an American Pentecostal minister and evangelist born in Miller County, Missouri, known primarily for his writings on the subjects of Pentecostal (or Charismatic) Evangelical Christian spirituality and Premillennial Dispensationalism.  His most well known work was the Dake Annotated Reference Bible.

Christian conversion
Dake became a Christian at age 17. Dake claimed that upon his conversion he received a 'special anointing' which allowed him to quote major portions of Scripture from memory. He preached his first sermon in 1925 and was ordained by the Assemblies of God denomination two years later. After working as a pastor and evangelist in Texas and Oklahoma, he moved to Zion, Illinois, in order to become the pastor of the Christian Assembly Church. In Zion, he also founded Shiloh Bible Institute, which ultimately merged with Central Bible Institute and which was located in the home formerly owned by controversial faith healer John Alexander Dowie.

Conviction for "debauchery and other immoral practices"
In 1937, during Dake's ministry in Zion, he was convicted of violating the Mann Act by willfully transporting 16-year-old Emma Barelli across the Wisconsin state line "for the purpose of debauchery and other immoral practices." The May 27, 1936, issue of the Chicago Daily Tribune reported that Dake registered at hotels in Waukegan, Bloomington, and East St. Louis with the girl under the name "Christian Anderson and wife". With the possibility of a jury trial and subject to penalties of up to 10-year's imprisonment and a fine of 10,000, Dake pleaded guilty, and served six months in the House of Corrections in Milwaukee, Wisconsin. Though he maintained his innocence of intent, his ordination with the Assemblies of God was revoked and he later joined the Church of God Cleveland, Tennessee. He eventually became independent of any denomination; it is not known why he later ended his relationship with the Church of God.

Writings
The Dake Annotated Reference Bible (1963) was the first widely published study Bible produced by someone from within Pentecostalism.  His annotated Authorized King James Version of the Bible took seven years to complete.  The 35,000 notes in the Dake Bible are considered by Christian theologians to be personal, rather than Biblically-based, commentary. Along with Dake's annotated Bible, his other writings have caused controversy amongst theologians.  His works include God's Plan for Man, Revelation Expounded, and Bible Truths Unmasked.

Death
Dake died of complications from Parkinson's disease on July 7, 1987.

References

External links
 Dake's Federal Trial and Conviction
 All Dake Products with many historic Dake pictures
 Dake Publications: The Official Publishing Arm of Dake Ministries
 The Apologetic's Index critique of the Dake Annotated Reference Bible
 Dake Bible Discussion Board
 Finis Dake Life Story Book
 Hear a recording of Finis Dake teaching concerning the Pre-Adamite World
 "30 Reasons for Segregation of Races" by Finis Dake

1902 births
1987 deaths
20th-century American clergy
American Assemblies of God pastors
American evangelists
American members of the clergy convicted of crimes
American Pentecostals
Bible commentators
Churches of God Christians
Deaths from Parkinson's disease
Neurological disease deaths in the United States
People convicted of violating the Mann Act